The protected areas of the United States are managed by an array of different federal, state, tribal and local level authorities and receive widely varying levels of protection. Some areas are managed as wilderness, while others are operated with acceptable commercial exploitation. , the 42,826 protected areas covered , or 13 percent of the land area of the United States. This is also one-tenth of the protected land area of the world. The U.S. also had a total of 871 National Marine Protected Areas, covering an additional , or 19 percent of the total marine area of the United States.

Federal level protected areas
Federal protected areas include lands and waters owned outright ("Fee ownerships"), as well as areas that are secured by easements, leases, etc. In addition to ownership-defined areas, there are numerous overlaying policy designations that apply management protections and use conditions on all or some of individual protected areas (e.g., Wilderness Areas, National Monuments, etc.).  

, according to the United Nations Environment Programme, the U.S. had a total of 6,770 terrestrial nationally designated (federal) protected areas. Federal level protected areas are managed by a variety of agencies, most of which are a part of the National Park Service, a bureau of the United States Department of the Interior. They are often considered the crown jewels of the protected areas. Other areas are managed by the United States Forest Service, the Bureau of Land Management and the United States Fish and Wildlife Service. The United States Army Corps of Engineers is claimed to provide 30 percent of the recreational opportunities on federal lands, mainly through lakes and waterways that they manage.

The highest levels of protection, as described by the International Union for Conservation of Nature (IUCN), are Level I (Strict Nature Reserves & Wilderness Areas) and Level II (National Parks). The United States maintains 12 percent of the Level I and II lands in the world.

Because U.S. federal protected areas include both ownership based names, and names related to overlaying policy designations, the naming system for U.S. protected areas results in some types being used by more than one agency. For instance, both the National Park Service and the U.S. Forest Service manage areas designated National Preserves and National Recreation Areas. The National Park Service, the U.S. Forest Service, and the Bureau of Land Management manage areas called national monuments. National Wilderness Areas are designated within other protected areas, managed by various agencies and sometimes wilderness areas span areas managed by multiple agencies. Those relying on U.S. protected areas data are advised to learn more about all of these conventions by reviewing the extensive PAD-US Help system. 

There are existing federal designations of historic or landmark status that may support preservation via tax incentives, but that do not necessarily convey any protection, including a listing on the National Register of Historic Places or a  designation as a National Historic Landmark. States and local zoning bodies may or may not choose to protect these. The state of Colorado, for example, is very clear that it does not set any limits on owners of NRHP properties.

Federal protected area designations

National Park System (list of areas here)
National Parks
National Preserves
National Seashores
National Lakeshores
National Forest
National Forests
National Grasslands
National Conservation Lands
National Monuments
National Conservation Areas
Wilderness Areas
Wilderness Study Areas
National Wild and Scenic Rivers
National Scenic Trails
National Historic Trails
Cooperative Management and Protection Areas
Forest Reserves
Outstanding Natural Areas
National Marine Sanctuaries
National Recreation Areas
National Estuarine Research Reserves
National Trails System
National Wild and Scenic Rivers System (list here)
National Wilderness Preservation System (list here)
National Wildlife Refuge System (list here)

International protected area designations

UNESCO Biosphere Reserves in the United States

State level protected areas
Every state has a system of state parks as well as many other types of protected areas (forests, reserves, refuges, recreation areas, etc.). State parks vary widely from urban parks to very large parks that are on a par with national parks. Some state parks, like Adirondack Park, are similar to the national parks of England and Wales, with numerous towns inside the borders of the park. Many states also operate game and recreation areas.

 Lists of state parks in the United States: Alabama, Alaska, Arizona, Arkansas, California, Colorado, Connecticut, Delaware, Florida, Georgia, Hawaii, Idaho, Illinois, Indiana, Iowa, Kansas, Kentucky, Louisiana, Maine, Maryland, Massachusetts, Michigan, Minnesota, Mississippi, Missouri, Montana, North Carolina, North Dakota, Nebraska, Nevada, New Hampshire, New Jersey, New Mexico, New York, Ohio, Oklahoma, Oregon, Pennsylvania, Rhode Island, South Carolina, South Dakota, Tennessee, Texas, Utah, Vermont, Virginia, Washington, West Virginia, Wisconsin and Wyoming
List of U.S. state and tribal wilderness areas
 List of Wildlife Management Areas in the U.S.

Local level protected areas
U.S. counties, cities and towns, metropolitan authorities, regional park systems, recreation districts and other units manage a wide variety of local public parks and other protected areas. Some of these are little more than picnic areas or playgrounds; however, others are extensive nature reserves. South Mountain Park in Phoenix, Arizona, for example, is called the largest city park in the United States; it spans  and contains  of trails.

List of protected areas by region
Protected areas of American Samoa
Protected areas of California
Protected areas of Colorado
Protected areas of Georgia
Protected areas of Illinois
Protected areas of Indiana
Protected areas of Kentucky
Protected areas of Michigan
Protected areas of North Carolina
Protected areas of Ohio
Protected areas of Puerto Rico

See also
Environmental movement in the United States

References

External links

National Landscape Conservation System (BLM Special Areas)
National Park Service
National Wild and Scenic Rivers System
National Wildlife Refuge System
Protected Areas Database of the United States (PAD-US)
PAD-US companion site - Protectedlands.net
National Conservation Easement Database (NCED)
U.S. Army Corps of Engineers Lakes Gateway
U.S. Forest Service
U.S. Marine Protected Areas